Jefferson Abacuc Vargas Pacheco (born 6 November 1984) is a Colombian former professional road cyclist.

Major results

2008
 1st Stage 4 Vuelta a Colombia
2011
 1st Stage 2 Vuelta al Valle del Cibao
2012
 1st Stage 4 Vuelta al Tolima

References
 

1984 births
Living people
Colombian male cyclists
Vuelta a Colombia stage winners
Sportspeople from Boyacá Department
21st-century Colombian people